Rune Richardsen (born 21 September 1962) is a retired Norwegian football striker.

Starting his career in Ull/Kisa, from 1980 to 1987 he played for Lillestrøm, becoming cup champion in 1985 and league champion in 1986.

His father Oddvar Richardsen was also capped for Norway. They were the eighth father-son combination to be capped.

References

1962 births
Living people
People from Ullensaker
Norwegian footballers
Lillestrøm SK players
Norway international footballers
Association football forwards
Sportspeople from Viken (county)